Isaac Nana Asare (born 1 January 1994), simply known as Nana, is a Ghanaian footballer who plays for as a midfielder.

Club career
Born in Accra, Nana started playing as a senior with RSD Alcalá in the 2011–12 campaign, in Spanish Segunda División B. On the 31st day of January 2013 he moved to Rayo Vallecano, being assigned to the reserves also in the third level.

On 31 July 2013 Nana joined another reserve team, Atlético Madrid B in the same division. He appeared regularly for the club in the season, playing in 34 matches (2634 minutes of action).

On 11 July 2014 Nana signed a four-year deal with Segunda División's Recreativo de Huelva. He made his professional debut on 10 September, starting in a 2–1 home win over SD Ponferradina for the campaign's Copa del Rey.

Nana appeared rarely for Recre during the campaign, as his side suffered relegation. On 3 February 2016, after making no appearances in the previous six months, he joined Cádiz CF.

Nana continued to appear in the third division in the following years, representing CF Fuenlabrada, Mérida AD, CF Badalona, UE Cornellà and Racing de Santander.

References

External links

1994 births
Living people
People from Accra
Ghanaian footballers
Association football midfielders
Segunda División players
Segunda División B players
RSD Alcalá players
Rayo Vallecano B players
Atlético Madrid B players
Recreativo de Huelva players
Cádiz CF players
CF Fuenlabrada footballers
Mérida AD players
CF Badalona players
UE Cornellà players
Racing de Santander players
Ghanaian expatriate footballers
Ghanaian expatriate sportspeople in Spain
Expatriate footballers in Spain